Le Frisur ("Le hairdo", using the female German noun with the male French article) is a concept album by German rock band Die Ärzte. It was released on 24 May 1996, and is entirely about hair. Originally intended as an EP, Le Frisur developed into a full-length album within the 14 days of its recording process.

Track listing

Personnel
 Farin Urlaub – guitar, vocals
 Bela Felsenheimer – drums, vocals
 Rodrigo González – bass guitar, vocals

Charts

Weekly charts

Year-end charts

References

1996 albums
Die Ärzte albums
Concept albums
German-language albums